Dornier Flugzeugwerke was a German aircraft manufacturer founded in Friedrichshafen in 1914 by Claude Dornier. Over the course of its long lifespan, the company produced many designs for both the civil and military markets.

History

Originally Dornier Metallbau, Dornier Flugzeugwerke took over Flugzeugbau Friedrichshafen production facilities (Weingarten, Warnemünde, and the former Zeppelin shed at Manzell) when it failed in 1923.

Dornier was well known between the two world wars as a manufacturer of large, all-metal flying boats and of land based airliners. The record-breaking 1924 Wal was used on many long distance flights and the Do X set records for its immense size and weight. Dornier's successful landplane airliners, including the Komet (Comet) and Merkur (Mercury), were used by Lufthansa and other European carriers during the 1920s and early 30s. Dornier built its aircraft outside Germany during much of this period due to the restrictions placed on German aircraft manufacturers by the Treaty of Versailles: locations included Altenrhein, Switzerland, 12 km from Zeppelin's Lindau (Bodensee) location. Foreign factories licence-building Dornier products included CMASA and Piaggio in Italy, CASA in Spain, Kawasaki in Japan, and Aviolanda in the Netherlands. Once the Nazi government came to power and abandoned the treaty's restrictions, Dornier resumed production in Germany.

The success of the Wal family encouraged the development of derivatives, and of more advanced successors, such as the Do 18, and Do 24 which saw service in several armed forces, including German, into World War II.

Dornier's most important World War II military aircraft design was the Do 17, nicknamed The Flying Pencil. It first flew in 1934 as a mailplane for Lufthansa but due to its narrow fuselage (hence its nickname) it was not commercially viable and was passed over. Dornier then developed it further as a military aircraft, with a prototype bomber flying in 1935, and in 1937 it was used in by the German Condor Legion during the Spanish Civil War. Production continued in Germany and it was developed to fill multiple roles for the Luftwaffe. As a medium bomber it saw service during the early part of World War II, particularly during the Battle of Britain. It was later developed into a nightfighter to counter the RAF bomber offensive. Dornier developed the similar looking Do 217 from the Do 17 but it was a larger and completely new design. Dornier also developed the fastest piston-engined fighter of the war, the twin-engined Do 335, which was too late to see service.

After WWII, aircraft production was again forbidden in Germany, and Dornier relocated to Spain and then to Switzerland where the firm provided aeronautical consultancy services until returning to Germany in 1954. Post-war, Dornier re-established itself with successful STOL Do 27 and Do 28 utility planes. In 1974 it joined a joint venture with French aircraft manufacturers Dassault-Breguet to develop the Alpha Jet.

In 1983, Hindustan Aeronautics Limited (HAL) acquired a production licence for the Dornier 228 and manufactured the aircraft for the Asian market. By 2013 a total of 117 Dornier 228 aircraft had been produced by HAL with plans to build 20 more during 2013-14.

In 1985, Dornier became a member of the Daimler-Benz group, integrating its aeronautic assets with the parent company. As part of this transaction, Lindauer Dornier GmbH was spun off, creating a separate, family-owned firm, concentrating on textile machinery design and manufacturing. The rest of the company was split into several subsidiaries for defence, satellites, medtech and aircraft.

In 1996, the majority of Dornier Aircraft was acquired by Fairchild Aircraft, forming Fairchild Dornier. This company became insolvent in early 2002. Production of its 328 Jet was acquired by US company Avcraft. Asian groups continued to show interest in its 728 version in August 2004, but production was not restarted. Dornier 228 production was taken over by Swiss manufacturer RUAG, who then sold it off to General Atomics in 2020. Other subsidiaries became part of the EADS.

The medtech division was sold to an investment company and now bears the name Dornier MedTech. Dornier Medtech manufactures medical equipment, such as the Dornier S lithotriptor, HM3, Compact Delta to treat kidney stones. Dornier MedTech also manufactures laser devices for a wide range of applications.

Dornier Seaplane Company
The Dornier family have a spin-off company and project, the Dornier Seastar. It is a turboprop-powered amphibious aircraft built largely of composite materials.

Dornier Technologie

Claude's grandson, founded Dornier Technologie in 1996 to manufacture the Dornier S-Ray 007.

Dornier aircraft projects

Letter designations (before 1933)
(Does not include designations for aircraft built while Dornier was with Zeppelin-Lindau)
 Dornier Gs Precursor to Wal destroyed by Military Inter-Allied Commission of Control (1919)
 Dornier Do A Libelle (I 1921, III redesignated Do 12)
 Dornier Spatz Landplane version of Do A (1922)
 Dornier Do B Merkur Development of Do C (1926)
 Dornier Do C Komet (I 1921, II 1922, III 1926)
 Dornier Do C 2, 3, 4 Fighter unrelated to earlier Do C, redesignated Do 10 (C 2 ?, C 3 1931, C 4 1932)
 Dornier Do D (1929)
 Dornier Do E (1924)
 Dornier Do F (1932, redesignated Do 11, 13, 23)
 Dornier Do G Grief (Cancelled 1920 project)
 Dornier Do H Falke (1922 development of Dornier-Zeppelin D.I)
 Dornier Do I (1923 twin engine long range reconnaissance aircraft)
 Dornier Do J Wal (1922)
 Dornier Do K (K 1 1929, K 2 1929, K 3 1931)
 Dornier Do L Delphin (I 1920, II 1921, III 1927)

 Dornier Do N Design for Japanese as Kawasaki Ka 87 (1926)
 Dornier Do O Wal Custom built version of Do J (1924)
 Dornier Do P (1930)
 Dornier Do R.2 and R.4 Superwal (1924)
 Dornier Do S (1930)
 Dornier Do T (Komet/Merkur converted to Air Ambulance)
 Dornier Do U (Cancelled civil variant of Do Y)
 Dornier Do X (1929)
 Dornier Do Y (1930, redesignated Do 15)

Additional unbuilt projects include 3 different Schneider Trophy racers from 1924, 1928 and 1931 and a large multi-engine seaplane similar to the Do X with engines buried in the wings.

1933-1945
 Dornier Do 10
 Dornier Do 11
 Dornier Do 12
 Dornier Do 13
 Dornier Do 14
 Dornier Do 15
 Dornier Do 16
 Dornier Do 17
 Dornier Do 18
 Dornier Do 19
 Dornier Do 20 Project
 Dornier Do 22
 Dornier Do 23
 Dornier Do 24
 Dornier Do 26
 Dornier Do 29 (1934)
 Dornier Do 212
 Dornier Do 214 Project
 Dornier Do 215
 Dornier Do 216 Project
 Dornier Do 217
 Dornier Do 247 Project
 Dornier Do 317
 Dornier Do 335
 Dornier Do 635
 Dornier P.59 Project
 Dornier P.85 Project
 Dornier P.184 Project
 Dornier P.232 Project
 Dornier P.247 Project
 Dornier P.252 Project
 Dornier P.254 Project
 Dornier P 256
 Dornier P.273 Project

1945-present
 Dornier Do 25 Prototype for Do 27
 Dornier Do 27
 Dornier Do 28 - developed from Do 27
 Dornier Do 29
 Dornier Do 31
 Dornier Do 32
 Dornier 128
 Dornier Do 132
 Dornier 228 - developed from Do 28
 Dornier Do 231
 Dassault/Dornier Alpha Jet
 Dornier 328
 Fairchild Dornier 328JET
 Fairchild Dornier 428JET
 Fairchild Dornier 728 family
 Dornier Aerodyne
 Dornier Seawings Seastar
 Dornier S-Ray 007
 Dornier LA-2000 (Study for a stealth strike aircraft with full delta wing similar to A-12 Avenger)

Dornier Automobile Projects

 Dornier Delta
 Dornier Delta II, developed for Hymer

Dornier Faint Object Camera

Dornier GmbH built the Faint Object Camera for the Hubble Space Telescope, which was used from 1990 to 2002. The ESA funded the unit, which actually consists of two complete and independent camera systems designed to provide extremely high resolution, exceeding 0.05 arcseconds. It is designed to view very faint UV light from 115 to 650 nanometers in wavelength. It was the last original instrument on the Hubble when it was replaced by the Advanced Camera for Surveys in 2002.

Missile projects
 Dornier Viper

Spacecraft
 AMC-5 (satellite)
 Project 621 (rocket)

See also

Dornier Museum Friedrichshafen
List of RLM aircraft designations
Zündapp Janus

References

External links

 DFW's Web Page 
 Dornier Museum Friedrichshafen

Aircraft manufacturers of Germany
German companies established in 1914
Vehicle manufacturing companies established in 1914
Vehicle manufacturing companies disestablished in 2002
Defunct aircraft manufacturers of Germany
Companies based in Friedrichshafen
German companies disestablished in 2002